Itoro Umoh-Coleman (born Itoro Umoh on February 21, 1977) is an American athlete and former WNBA basketball player. She played for the Clemson Tigers in college and served as head basketball coach for that team. In 2002, Umoh-Coleman was selected for the Atlantic Coast Conference '50-year all-star women's basketball team,' as well as '25th Anniversary Tournament' team.

Early years
Born in Washington, D.C., Umoh-Coleman grew up in Hephzibah, Georgia. She attended Hephzibah High School and played for the Lady Rebels under coach Wendell Lofton. She graduated in 1995.

College career 
During her sports playing career at Clemson University from 1995 to 1999, Umoh led the Lady Clemson Tigers to two ACC Championships. While at Clemson, she played both point guard and shooting guard. During her 1995-1996 freshman year at Clemson, in which the university won the ACC Championship, Umoh led the team in assists and steals. At Clemson, she was a 3-time All-ACC player.

She scored her 900th career point in 1998 during a Clemson-Wake Forest game in which coach Jim Davis won his 100th game.

During her 1999 senior ACC tournament, Umoh was awarded the MVP award in a rare unanimous vote. That same year, she was an honorable mention for the All-American team and Defensive All-American.

Umoh-Coleman represented the United States during the 1999 Pan American Games, with the team winning a bronze medal.

She graduated with a degree in communications from Clemson in 2000. She appeared in the 2002 romantic comedy film Juwanna Mann.

WNBA career 
In 1999 Umoh was in the preseason camps of the Minnesota Lynx and Washington Mystics but did not make either team. In 2002, after attending WNBA league camp tryouts, she was assigned to the Indiana Fever training camp, but failed to make the team.

In 2003, Umoh became the first Clemson player to be named to an active WNBA roster after being signed by the Houston Comets early in the season to replace the injured Cynthia Cooper (she had previously been in the Comets training camp that year but was waived before the regular season started). She played in three games for the team before being waived again.

Coaching
Her first coaching job was as a student assistant for Liberty University in 1999. After graduation from college, Umoh worked at Butler University, where she coached from 2000 to 2002. She accepted an assistant coaching job for the Lady Clemson Tigers in 2002. One of her major functions in the program was as a recruiter. She became the head coach of the team in 2010. After 3 years as head coach, she was let go by Clemson at the end of the 2013 season. She is now an assistant coach for Courtney Banghart at the University of North Carolina.

Nigerian National Team
At the 2004 Summer Olympic Games in Athens, Umoh-Coleman played for the Nigeria women's national basketball team.  She played on the team with Joanne Aluka, a fellow Hephzibah High School alumna. In 2006, Umoh-Coleman  played for the Nigerian national team at the FIBA world championships. She had the highest number of assists in the tournament.

Personal life
In December 1999, Itoro Umoh married Harold Coleman. Together, they have four children, three girls and a boy. They became the primary caregivers for her two younger siblings after the death of Umoh-Coleman's mother in 2002. They also care for Harold Coleman's nephew.

Notes

1977 births
Living people
African-American basketball players
American women's basketball players
American women's basketball coaches
Basketball players at the 1999 Pan American Games
Basketball players at the 2004 Summer Olympics
Basketball players from Washington, D.C.
Clemson Tigers women's basketball coaches
Clemson Tigers women's basketball players
Guards (basketball)
Houston Comets players
Liberty Lady Flames basketball coaches
Nigerian women's basketball players
Olympic basketball players of Nigeria
People from Hephzibah, Georgia
Pan American Games bronze medalists for the United States
Pan American Games medalists in basketball
Undrafted Women's National Basketball Association players
Medalists at the 1999 Pan American Games
United States women's national basketball team players